The 2013 F1600 Championship Series season was the third season of the F1600 Championship Series.

Eighteen-year-old Jake Eidson from Littleton, Colorado won the championship driving for Cape Motorsports w/ Wayne Taylor Racing. Eidson won seven of the twelve races and captured a race win in all but one of the series' weekend double-headers. Bryan Herta Autosport's Adrian Starrantino captured three wins on his way to runner-up honors in the championship.

Notably, IndyCar Series rookie Tristan Vautier joined the series for its race weekend at the Mid-Ohio Sports Car Course to gain experience at the track that he had not raced at before and where he would race in IndyCar a few weeks later. Vautier won the pole for race two, but finished just sixth and 13th in the pair of races.

Drivers and teams

Race calendar and results

Final points standings

(M) indicates Masters Class driver
Points include total points from 10 best races.

References

External links
 Official website

F1600 Championship
F1600 Championship Series seasons